VCHSR is a drug used in scientific research which acts as a selective antagonist of the cannabinoid receptor CB1. It is derived from the widely used CB1 antagonist rimonabant, and has similar potency and selectivity for the CB1 receptor, but has been modified to remove the hydrogen bonding capability in the C-3 substituent region, which removes the inverse agonist effect that rimonabant produces at high doses, so that VCHSR instead acts as a neutral antagonist, blocking the receptor but producing no physiological effect of its own.

References 

Cannabinoids
CB1 receptor antagonists
Pyrazoles
Chloroarenes